Clemens "Ardek" Wijers (born 10 November 1983) is a Dutch keyboardist, pianist, and composer best known as the keyboardist of Dutch symphonic black metal band Carach Angren. Before Carach Angren, Wijers played with Dark Mutation and then Vaultage where he met Dennis "Seregor" Droomers and they began Carach Angren as a side project, when the two connected over a shared love of horror and storytelling. Later Vaultage disbanded when Carach Angren became increasingly successful.

Biography 
Clemens is the older brother of Carach Angren's former drummer Ivo "Namtar" Wijers. He first started playing piano at the age of 7 and played with a local youth choir throughout his teen years. He grew interested in metal in his secondary school years and joined a band as a way of combining his new interest with his classical background. He also studied music at the Tilburg Conservatory in 2002 before forming Vaultage in 2003, and later co-forming Carach Angren. He has also completed a certificate in Cinematic Orchestration, taught by William Boston. Wijers has mentioned that he is a fan of orchestral soundtracks from films and video games, and that he was a big gamer in the 1990s who loved video game soundtracks.

Musical Work 
Alongside Carach Angren, Wijers has also released a solo album titled "Worlds" that is mainly a combination of industrial and classical music tracks. He has composed the soundtrack for a number of short films, including Firefly and the Coffee Machine by John Michael Wilyat; an animated short about a series of drawings by an eight-year-old girl coming to life. He also wrote music on Lindemann's album "Skills in Pills," and has written music for Pain and Ex Deo. He also offers piano lessons through his website. Typically, Wijers writes the composition for Carach Angren's music while bandmate Dennis "Seregor" Droomers writes the lyrics and stories.

Discography

Solo 

 Worlds (2017)

Carach Angren 

 The Chase Vault Tragedy (2004)
 Ethereal Veiled Existence (2005)
 Lammendam (2008)
 Death Came Through a Phantom Ship (2010)
 Where the Corpses Sink Forever (2012)
 This is no Fairytale (2015)
 Dance and Laugh Amongst the Rotten (2017)
 Franckensteina Strataemontanus (2020)

Other 

 Vaultage: Hallucinate Beyond (2003, keyboard and lyrics)
 Vredehammer : Pans skygge (2011, composition of first song on EP)
 Bodyfarm : Battle Breed (2015, composition of eleventh song)
 Lindemann : Skills in Pills (2015, orchestral composition and background vocals)
 Lindemann : F & M (album) (2020, orchestral version of Ach so gern)
 Pain : Coming Home (2016, composition) 
 Ex Deo : The Immortal Wars (2017, composition)
 Utbyrd : Varskrik (2017, composition)

See also 
 Carach Angren
 Dennis "Seregor" Droomers

External links 
 Official Website
 Solo Music: Available on Bandcamp
 Carach Angren Website
 Official Facebook

References 

1983 births
Dutch heavy metal keyboardists
Dutch keyboardists
Dutch pianists
Dutch composers
Dutch songwriters
Black metal musicians
Season of Mist artists
Living people
21st-century pianists